Sir Ronald Norman,  (born 29 April 1937) is a British businessman and author. Sir Ron received an OBE in 1986 for services to urban regeneration in Newcastle and was honoured with a knighthood in 1995 for services to Teesside.

Personal life
The son of a postman, he won a scholarship to Dulwich College where he studied sciences and made a mark as a boxer. He then studied Engineering at King's College London, graduating in 1960 with first-class honours in Civil Engineering and winning the University Boxing Championship. His book Odd Man Out in the Alps tells the story of his journey over two summers trekking 400 miles through the French Alps in little more than shorts and sandals.

Companies
Sir Ron's early work as an engineer included the construction of the famous hyperbolic paraboloid roof on the Commonwealth Institute in Kensington. From civil engineering he moved into management consultancy, general construction, property development and urban renewal. Eventually, he launched his own development company committed to setting higher standards of development, in particular by respecting local architectural traditions. In partnership with Professor David Bellamy, he also ran a pioneering consultancy aimed at persuading his fellow developers of the importance of environmental considerations. He has held director appointments at 31 companies, including:
President of the Tees Valley Community Foundation (previously known as Cleveland Community Foundation)
Chairman of the Teesside Development Corporation

References

1937 births
Alumni of King's College London
British chairpersons of corporations
Businesspeople awarded knighthoods
Deputy Lieutenants of Durham
English civil engineers
English travel writers
Knights Bachelor
Officers of the Order of the British Empire
Living people
People educated at Dulwich College